Richtmyer Peak is a mountain in Greene County, New York and partly in Schoharie County, New York. It is located in the Catskill Mountains southwest of West Durham. Mount Pisgah is located east, and Richmond Mountain is located southwest of Richtmyer Peak.

References

Mountains of Greene County, New York
Mountains of New York (state)
Mountains of Schoharie County, New York